is a former Japanese football player. She played for Japan national team.

National team career
Yoshida was born on August 12, 1957. On September 9, 1981, she debuted for Japan national team against Italy. However Japan was defeated this match by a score of 0–9. This is the biggest defeat in the history of Japan national team.

National team statistics

References

1957 births
Living people
Japanese women's footballers
Japan women's international footballers
Nissan FC Ladies players
Women's association footballers not categorized by position